Tubuca urvillei is a species of fiddler crab. It is found in the Southeastern Africa from southern Somalia to the South Africa and Madagascar.

Tubuca urvillei was formerly a member of the genus Uca, but in 2016 it was placed in the genus Tubuca, a former subgenus of Uca.

Description 
Carapace of male is broadly triangular and directed laterally. Anterolateral margin is short and slightly long. Major cheliped with dactylus usually longer than palm. Carapace of female is acutely triangular. Anterolateral margin absent.

References 

Ocypodoidea
Crustaceans of Africa
Crustaceans described in 1852